The Kia Forte, known as the K3 in South Korea, the Forte K3 or Shuma in China and Cerato in South America, Australia, New Zealand and Russia, is a compact car manufactured by South Korean automaker Kia since mid-2008, replacing the Kia Spectra. It is available in two-door coupe, four-door sedan, five-door hatchback variants. It is not available in Europe, where the similar sized Kia Ceed is offered (except for Russia and Ukraine, where the Ceed and the Forte are both available).

In some markets, such as Costa Rica, Australia and Brazil, the Forte is marketed as Kia Cerato, replacing its predecessor of the same name. In Colombia and Singapore, the name Cerato Forte was used for the second generation, while Naza Automotive Manufacturing of Malaysia has assembled the vehicle since 2009, selling it there under the name Naza Forte.



First generation (TD; 2008)

The first generation Forte was introduced in 2008. In North America, the Forte replaced the Kia Spectra, while the Forte retained the Cerato name in numerous markets. It shares the same platform as the Hyundai Avante/Elantra (HD), though employing a torsion-beam rear suspension in place of the Elantra's multilink design. Kia has stated that the Forte was specifically designed to target younger buyers attracted to sharper auto designs.

Succeeding the first generation Cerato or second generation Spectra, several elements of the interior and suspension were changed. The car received a wider (4 cm) and longer (3 cm) body, a longer (4 cm) wheelbase and a wider (7 cm) gauge. However, ground clearance was reduced by a centimeter, thereby reducing the height by a centimeter. At the same time, the design of the rear suspension was simplified, which instead of independent multilink thrust became semi-dependent double-lever, with an elastic beam, which made it more reliable and easy to repair and maintain.

Three body styles, which are compact 4-door sedan, 5-door hatchback, and a new 2-door coupe body style was introduced.

Sedan
The Forte sedan was designed in Kia's California design studio by Tom Kearns and his team. The Forte two-door ("Koup") was previewed as the "Kia Koup" Concept, and was also designed in Kia's California design studio. The Korean model went on sale on 22 August 2008. The US model was unveiled at the 2009 Chicago Auto Show.

Hatchback
The Forte five-door hatchback debuted at the 2010 New York International Auto Show.

Coupe (Koup) 
The two-door coupe "Forte Koup" was originally unveiled as a concept car in the form of the "Kia Koup" on 20 March 2008 at the New York International Auto Show. The concept sported a twin scroll turbocharged version of the 2.0-liter Theta II inline-four engine. The production Forte Koup is badged as the "Kia Cerato Koup" in Australia, Costa Rica, Russia and South Africa. It is called the "Kia Shuma" in China, and "Kia Koup" in Chile.

LPI Hybrid
In 2009, Kia unveiled the mild hybrid Forte at the Seoul Motor Show for the South Korean market. Taking its underpinnings from the Hyundai Elantra LPI Hybrid, the car is powered by liquefied petroleum gas (LPG). It is powered with an  1.6-liter LPG engine coupled with a  electric motor and a lithium-polymer battery pack, making it the first production car to use lithium-polymer batteries.

Powertrains

Safety
The 2010 Forte received a "Top Safety Pick" rating from the Insurance Institute for Highway Safety (IIHS).

Markets

North America
In the United States, the 2010 LX and EX included a 2.0-liter CVVT engine and a standard five-speed manual transmission, with an optional four-speed automatic or a five-speed automatic with the Fuel Economy Package. For the 2011 model year, the Forte is standard with a six-speed manual (replacing the 5 speed unit) and is available with an optional six-speed automatic, with the four- and five-speed automatics being discontinued.

The LX is the base model. It comes standard with electronic stability control (ESC), and seat- and side-mounted airbags. The standard stereo includes four speakers, AM/FM radio, CD/MP3 player, and Sirius XM Satellite Radio. An iPod-compatible USB input jack and an auxiliary port for an external music device and steering wheel mounted audio controls are also integrated with the sound system. Bluetooth handsfree technology is also standard. The second-tier EX adds air conditioning, power windows and door locks, cruise control, a six-speaker radio, a key fob with keyless entry, and turn signal indicators on the side mirrors. The SX has the 2.4-liter engine with a six-speed manual or optional five-speed automatic transmission for the 2010 model year and a six-speed from the 2011 model year. The SX also adds alloy wheels, a leather-wrapped steering wheel and shift lever, a tilting and telescoping steering column, sport-cloth seats, and a metallic finish to the interior. Later production models have soft-touch panels on the armrest and door, as well as on the dashboard. For 2011, the EX and SX sedans are automatic-only, while the base sedan and all models of the Koup and Forte5 continue to offer the choice of manual or automatic.

An optional Fuel Economy Package adds low resistance silica tires, a more efficient alternator, a five-speed automatic transmission, and aerodynamic enhancements to increase fuel efficiency. Automatic transmission models include an "Eco" display on the instrument panel that tells the driver when better than expected fuel efficiency is reached, hoping to influence driving habits toward more efficient operation.

For the Forte Koup, an optional leather package is available on both EX and SX trims. When combined with the EX trim, leather is utilized for the upholstery, steering wheel and shift lever; heated front seats and a sunroof are also included with the package. When paired with the SX trim, it includes only heated leather seats and the sunroof, as a leather-wrapped steering wheel and shift lever are already fitted as standard.

The Forte sold in Canada has similar specifications and equipment as the US-market model. Some differences include the addition of power windows, door locks and power heated exterior mirrors on the base LX trim, a telescopic steering wheel on the EX trim, and a standard sunroof and automatic climate control system on the SX trim. The EX and SX also have a chrome-trimmed rear garnish and door handles. In contrast to the transmissions offered in the United States, the automatic transmission on offer in Canada is a 6-speed.

Asia

China 
For the Chinese market, Kia has offered the "Forte Furuidi" (福瑞迪) or Forte (later Forte R for the facelifted model) produced by the Dongfeng Yueda Kia since 2009. The Furuidi was unveiled at the Nanjing International Expo Centre, and is available with the 1.6- Gamma and 2.0-liter Theta engines. "Furuidi" means luck and auspiciousness in the Chinese language—and has a pronunciation similar to its English name "Forte". It was sold alongside the Cerato R (First generation Cerato facelift), and later the K3 (Second generation Forte).

Malaysia 
In Malaysia, the first generation Forte is assembled by the joint-venture company Naza-Kia and is called the "Naza Forte" and in Singapore, the first generation Forte was called the "Kia Cerato Forte". Both regions were offered with the 1.6-liter Gamma and 2.0-liter Theta II engine variants featuring a four-speed automatic transmission at launch, and then received a six-speed automatic transmission with paddle shifters after the 2011 facelift.

Europe

In Russia and Ukraine, the Cerato (Forte) is available as the Cee'd's notchback counterpart, with the coupe and sedan available together. The Forte is not available in other European countries, due to the relatively low popularity of small family sedans there. Despite the LPI Hybrid being launched at the Frankfurt Motor Show, the Forte is still not offered in European countries outside Russia and Ukraine.

Kia Forte Furuidi (China) (2017–present) 

Derived from the Kia Forte Furuidi (福瑞迪) or Kia Forte R variant of the first generation Kia Forte facelift, Dongfeng Yueda Kia developed a succeeding Kia Forte Furuidi model with the "ND" factory code featuring a completely restyled body.

The Kia Forte Furuidi is powered by a lone 1.6 L G4FG straight-four petrol engine option developing 123hp (90.2kW) and 150.7Nm. Transmission is either a 6-speed automatic or 6-speed manual gearbox.

Second generation (YD; 2012)

Kia released images of the second generation Forte for the 2014 model year in late July 2012, when the company revealed its Korean-market counterpart, Kia K3. The car is completely redesigned with a lower, wider, and longer stance.

The second generation Kia Forte includes LED headlights and tail lights as a standard feature, and will further Kia's driver-oriented cockpit design inside.

The car was presented to the public for the first time outside of South Korea on Santiago Motorshow (Chile) as Kia Cerato, on 3 October 2012.

Forte Coupe (Koup)

The base Forte Koup EX comes with standard 16-inch alloy wheels, Bluetooth®, SiriusXM™ Satellite Radio, a leather-wrapped steering wheel with integrated audio and cruise control buttons, tilt and telescoping steering column, FlexSteer, power windows and LED positioning headlights with fog lights.

The Koup SX comes standard with 18-inch alloy wheels, UVO eServices with Rear Camera Display, dual chrome exhaust tips, and LED tail lights. The sportier SX also features performance enhancements including larger bumper and grille openings, larger front brakes, alloy sport pedals, black gloss grille inserts, and the front fascia and rear valance also include carbon fiber-look trim.

Both trims come with optional HID headlights, navigation system with HD Radio, heated steering wheel, power lumbar, sunroof, heated front seats and ventilated driver's seat, leather-trimmed seating, SmartKey with push-button start, and dual-zone automatic climate control.

The Forte Koup was discontinued after the 2016 model year due to slow sales along with the Hyundai Genesis Coupe.

2017 model year update 
For the 2017 model year, the Forte received a new facelift with restyled headlights, grille and bumper.

North America

Trim levels 
In the United States, the second-generation Kia Forte was available in four basic trim levels: LX, S, EX, and SX (later SX Turbo):

The LX was the base model of the Forte, and offered a plethora of standard equipment: an AM/FM stereo with single-disc CD/MP3 player, Bluetooth, Sirius XM Satellite Radio, and USB and auxiliary audio inputs with a four-speaker audio system, power windows and door locks, keyless entry with flip-key, exterior color-keyed door handles and side mirrors, fifteen-inch steel wheels with full wheel covers, a multifunction steering wheel, power rear trunk lid release, a split-folding rear bench seat, cloth seating surfaces, dual manually-adjustable front bucket seats, a 2.0L Inline Four-Cylinder (I4) gasoline engine, a six-speed manual transmission, and air conditioning. Additional options included sixteen-inch aluminum-alloy wheels, a 4.3-inch touch screen audio system with Kia UVO, premium cloth seating surfaces, a six-speaker audio system, and a six-speed automatic transmission.

The S became available in 2017, and added convenience features to the base LX trim level, such as: sixteen-inch aluminum-alloy wheels, a six-speed automatic transmission, a seven-inch touch-screen infotainment system featuring Apple CarPlay and Android Auto, a six-speaker audio system, and a leather-wrapped multifunction steering wheel. GPS navigation, and power single-pane sunroof was two of the available options.

The EX was the top-of-the-line Forte trim level, adding features to the base LX, such as: sixteen-inch aluminum-alloy wheels (seventeen-inch on 2016+ models), front fog lamps, power-folding side mirrors with integrated turn signals, a seven-inch touch-screen infotainment system featuring Apple CarPlay and Android Auto (2016+ models only), a six-speaker audio system, a leather-wrapped multifunction steering wheel, and perforated luxury leather-trimmed seating surfaces with dual heated front bucket seats (2016+ models only). Additional options included a driver assistance package, GPS navigation, a 4.3-inch touch screen audio system with Kia UVO (2014-2015 models only), perforated luxury leather-trimmed seating surfaces (standard on 2016+ models), dual heated front bucket seats (standard on 2016+ models), keyless access with push-button start, seventeen-inch aluminum-alloy wheels (standard on 2016+ models), a ventilated front driver's bucket seat, a single-pane power sunroof, a six-speed automatic transmission, and a rear spoiler.

The SX, only available on the Forte Koup and Forte5, was the top-of-the-line Forte trim level. It added the following options to the EX: GPS navigation, perforated luxury leather-trimmed seating surfaces (2014-2015 models), dual heated front bucket seats (2014-2015 models), a ventilated front driver's bucket seat, premium aluminum-alloy wheels, a 1.6L Turbocharged Inline Four-Cylinder (I4) engine (MY2014+ models only), a six-speed automatic transmission (MY2014-MY2016 models only), a seven-speed Dual Clutch (DCT) automatic transmission (MY2017+ models only), a power single-pane sunroof, and keyless access with push-button start. A six-speed manual transmission was the only available option.

Market variations

Asia
For the Singapore market, the car is known as the Forte K3 and is available in EX (16-inch steel wheels, dual airbags, rear air conditioner, LED daylight running lights, leather interior and rear parking sensor) and SX (17-inch alloy wheels, two airbags, front-and-rear parking sensors, keyless entry, push-button start, leather interior, power driver seat with memory) trims, with LED daylight running lights and rear aircon vents standard. Eurostyle touchscreen entertainment system available as an optional upgrade through a tie-up with a local installer. The only engine available is the naturally-aspirated 1.6-liter gasoline Gamma MPi producing 128 hp (130ps).

In the Malaysian market, the second generation Forte was launched in July 2013 as the "Kia Cerato". Throughout the time available in Malaysia, two engines were available: 1.6 liter Gamma II and 2.0 liter Nu MPi. At launch, two variants were available: 1.6 and 2.0 and in July 2014, a 1.6 KX variant was added positioned lower than the regular 1.6 variant.  In November 2015, the "Koup" variant was added to the range powered by a 1.6 liter Gamma T-GDI engine. In December 2016, the facelift version was made available with the same three variants and engines to choose from.

Safety
In a small overlap frontal crash test carried out by the Insurance Institute for Highway Safety (IIHS), the Kia Forte scored the lowest in the group in 2013. The test simulates the front corner of the vehicle hits a tree, utility pole, or even another vehicle at 40-mph. According to the IIHS, this situation accounts for about a quarter of the serious injuries sustained in frontal crashes. The 2017 redesigned Kia Forte earned the Insurance Institute for Highway Safety (IIHS) top safety pick for the compact car segment.

IIHS test results based on the 2018 Kia Forte:

Third generation (BD; 2018) 

On 15 January 2018, Kia unveiled the third generation Forte sedan at the 2018 North American International Auto Show in Detroit, Michigan. Taking styling cues from the Kia Stinger, the new Forte adopts a cab rearward exterior, resulting in a fastback profile and a short trunklid. The car is constructed with 54% advanced high-strength steel that is stronger than the outgoing model. The Forte will be offered with a 2.0L I4 carried over from the second generation model mated to either a 6-speed manual transmission, 6-speed automatic, 7-speed DCT, or Kia's first CVT, which Kia refers to as an IVT.

North America 
The Kia Forte is available in four trim levels: base FE and LXS, mid-level S, and top-level EX, and went on sale in the fall of 2018 as a 2019 model year vehicle. The new redesigned Kia Forte5 hatchback was not available in the U.S since it was already discontinued in 2018 due to low sales, and is currently only offered in sedan form. However, the second-generation Forte5 stayed in Canada until 2020 when they introduced the new redesigned Forte5 hatchback for the Canadian market as an option, and is available in four trim levels: Base EX, GT MT, GT and top-level GT-Limited.

The all-new Forte was designed by Kia lead designer Peter Schreyer, who also designed the Kia Stinger. The exterior profile of the 2019 Forte resembles that of the Stinger, and certain interior styling cues, such as a "Floating" center display touchscreen for the infotainment system, and round HVAC vents, were taken directly from the Stinger as well.

All trim levels of the new Forte  includes many features that are otherwise optional on its competitors, including automatic front headlights, a tilt and telescopic steering column, a rear trunk light, rear seat heat ducts, an eight-inch, touchscreen infotainment system featuring Apple CarPlay and Android Auto, steering wheel-mounted audio system controls, cruise control, Forward Collision Avoidance (FCA), Lane Departure Warning (LDW), and Lane Keeping Assist (LKA).

In addition to its standard equipment, other notable available features on the all-new Forte include LED interior lighting, a ten-way, power-adjustable front driver's seat with lumbar support, heated and ventilated dual front bucket seats, soft-touch interior surfaces, a 320-watt, eight-speaker premium amplified audio system by Harman Kardon, wireless device charging, drive mode selection, and a smart cruise control (SCC).

2020 update 
The GT and GT-Line trim levels were added and S trim level was discontinued as well as the 6 speed automatic transmission option was also discontinued and the LX trim was renamed LXS.

Mexico 
The Kia Forte for the Mexican market was initially offered in four trim levels: L, LX, EX, and EX Premium. It is offered in sedan and hatchback body styles. On 11 June 2021, the locally-built Forte was facelifted for the Mexican market, based on the Korean K3 styling. It is offered in the LX (sedan only), EX, GT Line, and GT trim levels and offered in automatic and manual transmission options.

Australia 
The Kia Cerato was introduced in mid-2018 in sedan form only, available in three trim levels: S, Sport, and Sport+. In late-2018, the range was bolstered with the addition of the hatchback body style and GT trim level. Due to the lack of advanced AEB features as standard on the entry-level S and Sport variants, the Cerato received a split ANCAP safety rating, with S and Sport receiving a four-star rating and other models five-star. The fleet-only Si trim level was later added for the 2019 model year with advanced AEB as standard.

Powertrain

Marketing
On 17 September 2018, Kia Motors America uploaded their commercial for the 2019 Forte, featuring the race-spec Red Bull car and professional race car driver Collete Davis.

Late 2021 facelift 
The facelifted K3 was introduced in South Korea on 20 April 2021, featuring both a 1.6-liter gasoline and a GT 1.6-liter turbo gasoline engine. Regarding the North American market, on 11 June 2021, the facelifted Forte first arrived in Mexico, built at the Pesquería plant in Nuevo León. The updated facelifted Kia Forte sedan later came to the United States on October 11, 2021. And lastly, in Canada, both the facelift sedan and hatchback models arrived on 6 December, 2021.

China
Launched in June 2019, the Chinese version of the Kia K3 was produced by Dongfeng Yueda Kia, and features a redesigned front and rear down road graphics. Engine options include a 1.5 liter inline-4 engine and a 1.4 liter turbo inline-4 engine, with a PHEV version also available.

2023 facelift
Different from the international version, the Chinese version of the Kia K3 received the mid-cycle refresh in 2023.

Safety
The 2022 Forte was tested by the IIHS:

Sales

References

External links

 (South Korea)
 (U.S.)

Forte
ANCAP small family cars
Euro NCAP small family cars
Compact cars
Coupés
Sedans
Hatchbacks
Front-wheel-drive vehicles
Cars introduced in 2008
2010s cars
Vehicles with CVT transmission